Georges Lannes (27 October 1895 – 8 July 1983) was a French film actor who appeared in more than a hundred films during his career including André Cornélis (1927).

Selected filmography
 The Mysteries of Paris (1922)
 Little Jacques (1923)
 The Abbot Constantine (1925)
 André Cornélis (1927)
 The Queen's Necklace (1929)
 The Citadel of Silence (1937)
 S.O.S. Sahara (1938)
 Beautiful Star (1938)
 Extenuating Circumstances (1939)
 There's No Tomorrow (1939)
 The Emigrant (1940)
 The Murderer is Afraid at Night (1942)
 The Sea Rose (1946)
 That's Not the Way to Die (1946)
 The Fugitive (1947)
 The Barton Mystery (1949)
 Mademoiselle Josette, My Woman (1950)
 The Night Is My Kingdom (1951)
 The Contessa's Secret (1954)
 Stopover in Orly (1955)
 The Whole Town Accuses (1956)
 Paris, Palace Hotel (1956)
 The Case of Doctor Laurent (1957)

References

Bibliography 
 Goble, Alan. The Complete Index to Literary Sources in Film. Walter de Gruyter, 1999.

External links 
 

1895 births
1983 deaths
French male film actors
French male silent film actors
20th-century French male actors
Male actors from Paris